The Court at 638-650 North Mar Vista Avenue is a bungalow court located at 638-650 North Mar Vista Avenue in Pasadena, California. Owner Karl Valentine built the court in 1927. The court consists of four single-family houses arranged alongside a courtyard with a duplex at the rear of the property. The buildings are designed in the Colonial Revival style and feature classical entrance porticos and wide eaves with exposed rafter tails.

The court was added to the National Register of Historic Places on November 15, 1994.

References

Bungalow courts
Bungalow architecture in California
Houses in Pasadena, California
Houses completed in 1927
Houses on the National Register of Historic Places in California
Historic districts on the National Register of Historic Places in California
National Register of Historic Places in Pasadena, California
1927 establishments in California
Colonial Revival architecture in California
Vernacular architecture in California